Anton Emdin (born 2 April 1976) is a freelance illustrator and cartoonist from Sydney, Australia.

Career 
Working as a freelance illustrator and cartoonist full-time since 1995, Emdin has drawn for numerous magazines, including the Australian editions of Rolling Stone, FHM, Ralph, People, Penthouse, The Spectator, The Spectator Australia, and MAD (both Australian and US editions).

Emdin also draws editorial illustrations for online news provider The Global Mail.

Amongst a bunch of educationals for schools, Emdin has illustrated various books, standouts being the Graphic Classics series featuring Mark Twain, Robert Louis Stevenson, Ambrose Bierce, and Edgar Allan Poe.

For commercial and advertising illustration work Emdin is represented by The Drawing Book Illustration Agency and has worked with many large advertising agencies such as JWT, Ogilvy, and Saatchi & Saatchi for clients including Macquarie Bank, Luxbet, and Kelloggs, as well as many smaller companies and individuals.

Minicomics  
In the early 1990s Emdin started drawing underground comix and collaborated with Ross Tesoriero on his first mini-comic If Pain Persists. Shortly after, Emdin published his own comic, Cruel World, and was one of the first in the Australia underground scene to produce full colour covers and professionally printed pages. Unfortunately the high production value did not reflect the low-brow content — Cruel World ran to issue 8.

Throughout his life, Emdin has continued to draw in the art and underground scene, contributing to books and comic anthologies such as Sick Puppy, Phatsville, Blackguard ', Pure Evil, and most recently, Blood and Thunder.

Awards 
 Australian Cartoonists' Association's (ACA) Gold Stanley Award for Cartoonist of the Year 2013 
 Australian Cartoonists' Association's (ACA) Stanley Award for Comic Book Artist, 2013 
 Australian Cartoonists' Association's (ACA) Stanley Award for Illustrator, 2013 
 National Cartoonists Society's (NCS) Reuben Division Award for Magazine Feature / Magazine Illustration, 2012 
 Australian Cartoonists' Association's (ACA) Stanley Award for Illustrator, 2012 
 Australian Cartoonists' Association's (ACA) Gold Stanley Award for Cartoonist of the Year 2011 
 National Cartoonists Society's (NCS) Reuben Division Award for Magazine Feature / Magazine Illustration, 2010 
 Australian Cartoonists' Association's (ACA) Stanley Award for Illustrator, 2011 
 Australian Cartoonists' Association's (ACA) Stanley Award for Illustrator, 2010 
 Desktop CREATE:2010 Awards for Illustration / Typography Category (shortlisted) 
 Australian Cartoonists' Association's (ACA) Stanley Award for Illustrator, 2009 
 National Cartoonists Society's (NCS) Reuben Division Award for Magazine Feature / Magazine Illustration, 2009  (nominated)
 Australian Cartoonists' Association's (ACA) Stanley Award for Illustrator, 2008  (nominated)

Notes

External links 
 Official Portfolio
 Anton Emdin's Illustration and Cartooning Blog
 Facebook: Anton Emdin Illustration and Cartooning
 Anton Emdin on Behance

Living people
Australian cartoonists
1976 births